St Leonards may refer to:

Places

Australia 
St Leonards, New South Wales
St Leonards railway station
St Leonards, Tasmania, suburb of Launceston
St Leonards, Victoria

Canada 
St. Leonard's, Newfoundland and Labrador

New Zealand 
St Leonards, Hawke's Bay, a suburb of Hastings
St Leonards, Otago, a suburb of Dunedin

United Kingdom 
St Leonards, Buckinghamshire
St Leonards, Dorset
St Leonards-on-Sea, Hastings, East Sussex
St Leonards, East Kilbride
St Leonard's, Edinburgh
St Leonards (Edinburgh) railway station
St Leonard's (ward), Lambeth, London
Cholesbury-cum-St Leonards, Buckinghamshire
Drayton St. Leonard, Oxfordshire
Upton St Leonards, Gloucestershire

Churches 
St Leonard's Church (disambiguation)

Schools and colleges 
St Leonard's Catholic School, Durham, England
St Leonard's College (Melbourne), Australia
 St Leonard's Primary School, Glenelg, South Australia
St Leonard's College (University of St Andrews), Scotland
St Leonards School, St Andrews, Scotland
St Leonard's Secondary School, Glasgow, Scotland
The St Leonards Academy, Hastings, England

Arts and entertainment
 St. Leonards (album), 2018 album by Slowly Slowly
 St Leonards (band), an Australian alternative rock band

Other uses
 Baron St Leonards, a title in the Peerage of the United Kingdom
 Leonard, a given name and surname

See also
Saint Leonard (disambiguation)
Leonard (disambiguation)
Leonards (disambiguation)